Valiabad (also Romanized as Valīābād) is a village in Mir Shams ol Din Rural District, in the Central District of Tonekabon County, Mazandaran Province, Iran.

It is  located on the Caspian Sea.

At the 2006 census, its population was 3,012, in 888 families.

References 

Populated places in Tonekabon County
Populated coastal places in Iran
Populated places on the Caspian Sea